The Horusornithidae are a prehistoric family of birds of prey. They are part of the Accipitriformes. Their name means "Horus-birds": the Egyptian god Horus was sometimes depicted as a falcon.

Horusornis vianeyliaudae is the only known species. It lived approximately at the end of the Eocene, some 35 mya in what today is France. Its fossils were found in Quercy.

The relationships between falcons and other birds of prey (such as hawks and eagles) are not resolved to satisfaction. Horusornis may have been a "missing link" uniting falcons, hawks, and the secretarybird. If falcons are more distantly related to other birds of prey, the horusornithids would rather be basal relatives of hawks that somewhat resembled falcons due to convergent evolution.

References
 Haaramo, Mikko (2005): Mikko's Phylogeny Archive: Accipitridae. Version of 2005-NOV-15. Retrieved 2007-MAY-17.

Birds of prey
Prehistoric birds of Europe
Eocene first appearances
Eocene extinctions
Paleogene France
Fossils of France
Quercy Phosphorites Formation
Taxa named by Cécile Mourer-Chauviré